Everything Changes is the sixth studio album by English singer-songwriter Julian Lennon. It was released on 2 October 2011.

History
Lennon has described the material as "a bit more free-flowing than [his] previous work", calling it his "favourite album so far". Revealing how Everything Changes came about, Lennon explained: "Obviously, if you sit down and play around for a bit, you’re going to come up with ideas. One thing led to another and pretty soon I had about 30 ideas, so I invited some friends to come over and flesh them out into songs".

Release

Everything Changes was released on 2 October 2011 on CD by Nova Sales & Distribution (UK) and Conehead; and only saw a UK/Ireland release. The album is his first since 1998's Photograph Smile. The album is set to be released on clear vinyl.

The first single from the album was "Lookin' 4 Luv", released digitally on 11 September 2011. The second single was a remix of an album track, "Guess It Was Me", released on 8 April 2012.

On 4 June 2013, the album was re-released with two additional bonus tracks: "Someday", featuring Steven Tyler and "In Between". This follows after Lennon contributed backing vocals to the Aerosmith track "LUV XXX" from the 2012 album Music from Another Dimension!. The re-release revised the track listing slightly; as opposed to placing the new tracks as the last two of the album, they were integrated into original track listing. The iTunes re-release also features an exclusive bonus 41-minute video documentary "Through The Picture Window"

In September 2014 a limited edition box set was released containing 3 CD's (the studio album, as well as an instrumental version, and an acoustic version); a DVD of the documentary noted above; a vinyl version of the studio album; and a photography booklet.

Track listing

Notes
 "Beautiful" was previously released on Lennon's "Lucy" single in 2009.
 "Someday" and "In Between" (Produced by Julian Lennon and Mark Spiro; Engineered and Mixed by Angelo Caputo; Assistant Engineer – Mike Gaydusek for NightBird Recording Studios, West Hollywood, CA) were added to the 2013 re-release of Everything Changes. "Someday" was released as a single on 8 April 2013.

Personnel 
Musicians
 Julian Lennon – lead and backing vocals, acoustic piano, keyboards, programming, strings, guitar, bass, drums
 Grant Ransom – keyboards, programming, guitar, bass, drums
 Peter-John Vettese – keyboards, programming, guitar, bass, drums, backing vocals
 Gregory Darling – acoustic piano, keyboards
 Matt Backer – guitar, sitar
 Mark Evans – guitar
 Justin Clayton – guitar, bass on "Beautiful"
 Guy Chambers – guitar, bass on "Never Let You Go"
 Mark Spiro – acoustic guitar on "In Between"
 Guy Pratt – bass
 Vanessa Fraebairn-Smith – cello
 Tim Ellis – backing vocals

"Always"
 Jebin Bruni – acoustic piano, keyboards
 Paul Stanborough – programming
 David J. Carpenter – bass
 Bryan Head – drums 
 Vanessa Fraebairn-Smith – cello
 Sonus Quartet – strings

"Someday"
 Julian Lennon – lead and backing vocals 
 Steven Tyler – lead and backing vocals 
 Mark Spiro – acoustic guitar, backing vocals 
 Jon MacLennan – electric guitar 
 Steve Sidelnyk – programming, drums, percussion
 Steve Sidwell – string arrangements
 Vanessa Fraebairn-Smith – cello
 Rob Brophy – viola 
 Tereza Stanislave – violin 
 Alwyn Wright – violin

References

2011 albums
Julian Lennon albums